"Släpp alla sorger" is a song by Swedish duo Nordman, released as a single on 18 February 2023. It was performed in Melodifestivalen 2023.

Charts

References

2023 songs
2023 singles
Melodifestivalen songs of 2023
Songs written by Thomas G:son